The Cabinet National Security Committee (NSC) is a cabinet-level committee of the New Zealand Department of the Prime Minister and Cabinet that was created in October 2014 by the Fifth National Government. This body is modelled after the British National Security Council and the Australian National Security Committee of Cabinet. The NSC is headed by the Minister of National Security and Intelligence.

The NSC is given oversight over New Zealand's intelligence community and security services and tasked with considering policies and proposals relating to those departments. Another function of the Cabinet National Security Committee is to coordinate and direct national responses to major crises or national security problems. The members of the Committee are the Prime Minister and Ministers responsible for the Civil Defence, the Defence, Foreign Affairs, Government Communications Security Bureau, New Zealand Security Intelligence Service, and Police portfolios.

Committee Members

References

2014 establishments in New Zealand
Emergency management in New Zealand
Government agencies of New Zealand
New Zealand
New Zealand intelligence agencies